The Indiana Department of Natural Resources Law Enforcement Division is the law enforcement division of the Indiana Department of Natural Resources, the fish and game regulatory agency of Indiana. The department has jurisdiction anywhere in the state and in state territorial waters. The division headquarters is located in Indianapolis and operates 10 law enforcement districts in the state. The Law Enforcement Division employs 214 conservation officers. Indiana conservation officers not only enforce state laws, but teach outdoor education courses, conduct river rescue, cave rescue, underwater search and recovery, and have K-9 teams.

History
In 1897, the Indiana General Assembly gave the Commissioner of Fisheries (the predecessor to the Indiana Department of Natural Resources) the authority to appoint at least one deputy in every Indiana county. In 1911, an act was passed establishing game wardens. The Law Enforcement Division is Indiana's oldest state law enforcement agency.

Law enforcement districts
Source: Indiana DNR Law Enforcement Contact List and Districts Map.

District 1
District headquarters: Syracuse, Indiana 
Saint Joseph County, Elkhart County, Marshall County, Kosciusko County, Fulton County, Miami County, Wabash County

District 2
Headquarters: Columbia City, Indiana 
 LaGrange County, Steuben County, Noble County, De Kalb County, Whitley County, Allen County, Huntington County, Wells County, Adams County

District 3
District headquarters: West Lafayette, Indiana
 Benton County, White County, Cass County, Warren County, Tippecanoe County, Carroll County, Fountain County, Montgomery County, Clinton County, Boone County

District 4
District headquarters: Anderson, Indiana 
 Howard County, Grant County, Blackford County, Jay County, Tipton County, Madison County, Delaware County, Randolph County, Hamilton County, Henry County, Wayne County

District 5
District headquarters: Cloverdale, Indiana 
 Vermillion County, Parke County, Putnam County, Vigo County, Clay County, Owen County, Sullivan County, Greene County

District 6
District headquarters: Nashville, Indiana
 Hendricks County, Marion County, Hancock County, Morgan County, Johnson County, Shelby County, Monroe County, Brown County, Bartholomew County 
The Law Enforcement Division headquarters in located in Indianapolis, Indiana, in Marion County. Central Dispatch is located in Bloomington, Indiana, in Monroe County.

District 7
District headquarters: Winslow, Indiana 
 Knox County, Daviess County, Martin County, Gibson County, Pike County, Dubois County, Posey County, Vanderburgh County, Warrick County, Spencer County

District 8
District headquarters: Birdseye, Indiana
 Lawrence County, Jackson County, Orange County, Washington County, Scott County, Crawford County, Harrison County, Floyd County, Clark County, Perry County

District 9
District headquarters: Versailles, Indiana 
 Rush County, Fayette County, Union County, Decatur County, Franklin County, Jennings County, Ripley County, Dearborn County, Jefferson County, Switzerland County, Ohio County

District 10
District headquarters: Michigan City, Indiana 
 Lake County, Porter County, La Porte County, Newton County, Jasper County, Starke County, Pulaski County

See also

 Indiana Department of Natural Resources
 List of law enforcement agencies in Indiana

References

External links
 Department of Natural Resources: Law Enforcement

State law enforcement agencies of Indiana
Government agencies established in 1897
1897 establishments in Indiana
State environmental protection agencies of the United States
Natural resources agencies in the United States